The Parliament of Kenya is the bicameral legislature of Kenya. It is based at Parliament Buildings in Nairobi and consists of two houses. The upper house is the Senate, and the lower house is the National Assembly.
Politics of Kenya
List of legislatures by country
Legislative branch

References

External links
 

Politics of Kenya
Kenya
K